Macrozamia fearnsidei is a species of plant in the family Zamiaceae. It is endemic to Australia.

References

fearnsidei
Least concern flora of Australia
Nature Conservation Act vulnerable biota
Vulnerable flora of Australia
Least concern biota of Queensland
Flora of Queensland
Taxonomy articles created by Polbot